Efrat Shvily (born 1955) is an Israeli artist based in Jerusalem. She has exhibited her work in the 50th Venice Biennale and the 8th International Istanbul Biennial, both in 2003.

Overview
Shvily has had many international solo exhibitions and has participated in group exhibition in the USA, Europe, and elsewhere.

Her work, influenced by her occupation as a journalist and education in political science, has been mainly focused on Israeli occupation of Palestinian territories and the different aspects of the Israeli–Palestinian conflict. Most notable in this theme as well as Shvily's career are two series: "New Homes In Israel And The Occupied Territories" – A series of photographs documenting "Anonymous deserted buildings", Arabic houses, in occupied territories; and "Palestinian Cabinet Ministers" – A series of portraits of all the Palestinian government ministers.

In recent years Shvily has been focused on video as her main artistic medium, most recently producing the show "The Jerusalem Experience" which was exhibited in Graz, Austria and in Geneva, Switzerland.

Solo exhibitions
 2017, The Jerusalem Experience, Centre de la photographie, Geneva
 2015, The Jerusalem Experience, Camera Austria, Graz.
 2014, Jasmine Fruit, Galerie Martine & Thibault de La Châtre, Paris
 2013, Point/Counterpoint: Efrat Shvily, Works 1992-2012, Museum of Art, Ein Harod
 2010, The Bride, Galerie Martine & Thibault de La Châtre, Paris
 2006, Solo Exhibition, Espace Arts Plastiques Venissieux, Septembre de la Photographie, Lyon
 2005, Have No Fear At All, Musrara Community Gallery, Jerusalem
 2004, 21 MOIS DES 3 MONDES, Theatre de L'Agora et La Maison du Monde d'Évry, Évry
 2004, SA'HKI SA'HKI, Sommer Contemporary Art, Tel Aviv.
 2002, Solo Exhibition, Center de la photographie, Geneva
 1995, Solo Exhibition, Herzliya Museum, Herzliya.

"New Homes In Israel And The Occupied Territories"
In this project Efrat Shvily presents a series of scenery photographs showing abandoned or unoccupied houses and buildings, all of which located either on Israeli or Palestinian territory. The buildings, some old, some new, are unaccounted for, unexplained by the artist, presented as they are "barren, devoid of human presence, abandoned and neglected". Their ghost-like presence alludes to the power struggle and political tensions in the area. The two mediums of architecture and photography enact a battle between change and memory, as Shvily's own documentation of the buildings – political tools and means, as well as ends within themselves – takes on the role of a political act. The photographs attempt to both salvage what is lost in the Palestinian territories, while exposing the unnaturalness, the strangeness of the new settlement – and all of this is done within a blur, not distinguishing between the two types of structures in any formal way.

References

External links
 Efrat Shvily Artist Page at Sommer Contemporary Art (Gallery website)

1955 births
Living people
People from Jerusalem
Israeli artists